Shankar Damodar Pendse (Devanagari: शंकर दामोदर पेंडसे) (1897 - 1974) was a Marathi writer from Maharashtra, India.

He chaired Marathi Sahitya Sammelan at Pandharpur in 1955.

Literary work
The following are Pendse's major works:
 Maharashtracha Sanskrutik Itihas (महाराष्ट्राचा सांस्कृतिक इतिहास)
 Dnyandev Ani Namdev (ज्ञानदेव आणि नामदेव)
 Waidik Wāṅmayātīl Bhāgawat Dharmāchā Wikās
 Paurāṇik Bhāgawat Dharma
 Bhāgavatottam Sant Shrī Ekanāth
 Sākshātkārī Sant Tukāram

References
Dô. Śã. Dā. Ṗeṇḍase Gaurava-Grantha - Arthāta Sant Sāhitya Saṃskr̥tī (in Marathi) edited by Achyut Narayan Deshpande

Marathi-language writers
1897 births
1974 deaths
Presidents of the Akhil Bharatiya Marathi Sahitya Sammelan